The Documentary 2.5 is the eighth studio album by American rapper the Game. It was released on October 16, 2015, by Blood Money Entertainment and eOne Music. The album is the second half for the two-piece project that was divided from the first half of his seventh album The Documentary 2 (2015), which was released a week earlier. The album features guest appearances from will.i.am, Schoolboy Q, Jay Rock, Nas, DJ Quik, Busta Rhymes and Problem, among others. The album was supported by the single: "El Chapo" with Skrillex.

Singles
The lead single from The Documentary 2.5, "El Chapo" was released on October 9, 2015. The song features a duet and additional vocals from disc jockey Skrillex, who also produced this track, alongside Mr. Bangladesh and Nastradomas.

Critical reception

The Documentary 2.5 received widespread acclaim from contemporary music critics. At Metacritic, which assigns a normalized rating out of 100 to reviews from mainstream critics, the album received an average score of 79, which indicates "generally favorable reviews", based on 6 reviews.

Commercial performance
The Documentary 2.5 debuted at number six on the US Billboard 200 with 48,000 album-equivalent units, which included 42,000 pure album sales. It serves as the Game's eighth top-ten album in the United States. The album dropped to the number 29 in its second week, earning an additional 15,000 album-equivalent units. As of November 2015, The Documentary 2.5 had accumulated 63,000 album-equivalent units in the United States, with 54,000 being pure sales.

Track listing

Notes

 "Moment of Violence" contains uncredited vocals performed by Elijah Blake.
 "Like Father, Like Son 2" contains additional vocals performed by Harlem Caron Taylor and King Justice Taylor.
 Adam Turchin — saxophone's
 Koofreh Umoren — trumpet

Sample credits
"Magnus Carlsen" contains samples of "Rocket Love" performed by Stevie Wonder.
"Crenshaw / 80s and Cocaine" contains samples of "Power of Soul" performed by Idris Muhammed, and "Blow Your Head" performed by Fred Wesley and the J.B.s.
"The Ghetto" contains samples of "Tower Of Power" performed by Sparkling in the Sand.
"From Adam" contains samples of "Who Made You Go" performed by Faith, Hope & Charity.
"Up on the Wall" contains samples of "Get Down on It", written by James "J.T." Taylor, Ronald Bell, performed by Kool & the Gang.
"Like Father, Like Son 2" contains samples of "Like Father, Like Son" performed by the Game.
"Life" contains samples of "You Give Good Love" performed by Whitney Houston, and an interpolation of "Some How Some Way" performed by Jay Z.
"El Chapo" contains samples of "Granada" performed by Frank Sinatra.

Charts

Weekly charts

Year-end charts

References

2015 albums
Albums produced by DJ Quik
Albums produced by the Alchemist (musician)
Albums produced by DJ Khalil
Albums produced by Cool & Dre
Albums produced by Fredwreck
Albums produced by Battlecat (producer)
The Game (rapper) albums
Sequel albums